= 1995 Czech Social Democratic Party leadership election =

1995 ČSSD leadership election
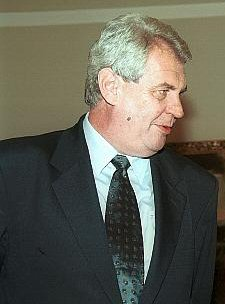
Candidate	Miloš Zeman
Electoral vote	314
Percentage	83.96%
Leader of ČSSD before election
Miloš Zeman
Elected Leader of ČSSD
Miloš Zeman

The Czech Social Democratic Party (ČSSD) leadership election of 1995 was held in April 1995. Miloš Zeman was reelected as the leader of the party. Zeman received 314 votes of 374.
